Eilema stevensii is a moth of the subfamily Arctiinae. It was described by George Hampson in 1900. It is found in Tanzania.

References

 

Endemic fauna of Tanzania
stevensii
Moths described in 1900